Room 6 is a 2006 American horror film directed by Michael Hurst and written by Hurst and Mark A. Altman. It stars Christine Taylor, Shane Brolly, Jerry O'Connell, and Ellie Cornell.

Plot
Amy is an elementary school teacher who suffers from nightmares about doctors and hospitals, stemming from the circumstances of her father's death. On the afternoon of the day he proposed, Amy and her fiancé Nick are in a serious car accident. An ambulance takes Nick away without telling Amy which hospital they are going to. Amy and Lucas, the driver of the truck that hit them, try to find where Nick and Lucas' sister have been taken. Amy begins to hallucinate, seeing disfigured faces, including her own in a mirror. A little girl in her class, Melissa, claims she can help Amy find Nick, and gives Amy the name of St. Rosemary's Hospital. Amy and Lucas learn that St. Rosemary's, which was rumored to be the home of devil worshipers, was destroyed in a fire some 70 years ago, along with all the nurses and staff, who refused to leave. Meanwhile, Nick is having his own strange experiences at St. Rosemary's, such as nurses who spray blood on each other and eat another patient, and a hallway that repeats itself.

After another hallucination, Lucas comforts Amy, but is revealed as a demon, taunting her about her father's death. She escapes him, and takes a cab to the hospital, where she is attacked by the nurses and hallucinations of dead patients. She encounters her father's ghost and relives his death when she was 12 years old, where at his demand she unplugged the machine keeping him alive. The Lucas demon catches up with Amy, telling her she belongs with the ghosts and monsters at St. Rosemary's because she murdered her father. She scalds Lucas with hot steam and escapes again, eventually rescuing Nick from the operating table. The hospital spontaneously begins to burn as they escape into the light. As Amy wakes up still in the car accident, she realises her experiences have been a test, and she is about to die.

Cast
 Christine Taylor – Amy Roberts
 Marissa N. Blanchard as Young Amy Roberts
 Shane Brolly – Nick Van Dyke, Amy's boyfriend
 Jerry O'Connell – Lucas Dylan, driver of the truck that hits Amy and Nick
 Lisa Ann Walter – Sgt. Burch
 Jack Riley – Brewster, a patient in the recovery ward
 Chloë Grace Moretz – Melissa Norman, a strange little girl in Amy's class
 John Billingsley – Harrison McKendrick, another patient in the recovery ward, removed in the middle of the night
 Mary Pat Gleason – Nurse Norma Holiday, head nurse at St. Rosemary's
 Ellie Cornell – Sarah Norman, Melissa's mother
 Marshall Bell – Mr. Roberts
 James Michael McCauley – Priest/Church Demon
 Kane Hodder – Homeless Demon
 Peter MacKenzie – Dr. Kent
 Stacy Fuson – Nurse Price
 Katie Lohmann – Nurse Peterson
 Cheryl Tsai – Nurse Park
 Jill Montgomery – Nurse Montgomery
 Mark A. Altman – Doctor Altman

References

External links
 
 
 Interview with Christine Taylor

2006 films
2006 horror films
Films scored by Joe Kraemer
2000s English-language films
Films directed by Michael Hurst